Uruma is a city in Okinawa Prefecture, Japan. Uruma may also refer to
Uruma Delvi, a contemporary Japanese husband and wife singing duo
Tomeju Uruma (1902–1999), Japanese speed skater 
Mordellina uruma, a species of beetle